Cecilio Leal (born 16 January 1972) is a Spanish weightlifter. He competed in the men's featherweight event at the 1992 Summer Olympics.

References

1972 births
Living people
Spanish male weightlifters
Olympic weightlifters of Spain
Weightlifters at the 1992 Summer Olympics
Sportspeople from Almería
20th-century Spanish people